This is a list of broadcast television stations that are licensed in the U.S. state of Ohio.

Full-power stations
VC refers to the station's PSIP virtual channel. RF refers to the station's physical RF channel.

Defunct full-power stations
Channel 15: WICA-TV - Ashtabula (8/25/1953 - 6/16/1956 and 12/15/1965 - 12/26/1967)
Channel 16: WKTR-TV - Ind. - Kettering (3/20/1967 - 1970)
Channel 26: WSWO-TV - Ind. - Springfield (7/14/1968 – 6/19/1970, 6/17/1972 – 12/6/1972)
Channel 30: WRLO - Portsmouth (5/14/1966 - 1968 or 1969)
Channel 30: WUXA - Ind. - Portsmouth (5/8/1988 - 1989)
Channel 31: WGSF - PBS - Newark (3/18/1963 - 6/30/1976)
Channel 42 (RF channel 43): WPBO - PBS \ Portsmouth (October 1973 - 10/27/2017)
Channel 45: WXTV - Youngstown (11/15/1960 - 2/28/1962)
Channel 61: WKBF-TV - Ind. - Cleveland (1/19/1968 - 3/21/1975)
Channel 68: WCOM - Ind. - Mansfield (1988 - 1989)

LPTV stations

Translators

Cable-only stations
Zanesville CW 13 - The CW - Zanesville

Ohio
Television stations